This is a list of the governors of the province of Kapisa, Afghanistan.

Governors of Kapisa Province

See also
 List of current governors of Afghanistan

Notes

Kapisa